Newington Junction is a section of the town of Newington, Connecticut. It is centered at the intersection of Willard Avenue (Route 173) and West Hill Road in the northwestern part of the town, in the area generally just south of the Hartford city line. The name of the area refers to the railroad junction where the railroad line from New Haven meets with the railroad line from Bristol and Waterbury. The development of Newington Junction as a result of the railroad was instrumental in the separation of the town of Newington from its mother town of Wethersfield.

The area is also architecturally significant for the range of styles used in houses built during the period of significance of the area. The neighborhood contains houses with architectural styles from the late 18th century to the early 20th century. For reasons of both historical and architectural significance, a significant portion of the neighborhood has been listed on the National Register of Historic Places as historic districts. The architectural centerpiece of Newington Junction is the Willard Homestead and the Newington Junction Railroad Depot located in the center of the neighborhood. Both properties are separately listed on the National Register. Because the central area is now surrounded by incompatible modern structures, the architecturally significant areas of the neighborhood have been grouped into three clusters, each designated as a separate historic district, namely, Newington Junction South, North, and West Historic Districts.

Historic districts

Newington Junction South Historic District

The South district is located along Willard Avenue south of the intersection with West Hill Road (268-319 Willard Avenue). The houses here include examples of Late Victorian, Colonial, Gothic Revival styles, showcasing architecture from the period 1800-1924.

Newington Junction North Historic District

The North district is located along Willard Avenue north of the intersection with West Hill Road (55-108 Willard Avenue). The houses here include examples of Colonial Revival, Late Victorian, and Queen Anne styles, showcasing architecture from the period 1850-1949.

Newington Junction West Historic District

The West district is primarily located along West Hill Road (269-303 West Hill Road) but also includes two additional properties on Willard Avenue near the intersection of Willard Avenue and West Hill Road. The houses include examples of Colonial, Colonial Revival, and Late Victorian styles, showcasing architecture from the period 1650-1949.

References

 (nps.gov)

See also
Newington Junction station
National Register of Historic Places listings in Hartford County, Connecticut

Neighborhoods in Connecticut
Populated places in Hartford County, Connecticut
Gothic Revival architecture in Connecticut
Historic districts in Hartford County, Connecticut
Newington, Connecticut
National Register of Historic Places in Hartford County, Connecticut
Historic districts on the National Register of Historic Places in Connecticut